Detroit Cristo Rey High School (DCRHS) is a private, coeducational, Roman Catholic high school in Detroit, Michigan, in the West Vernor-Junction Historic District. It opened in August 2008 and operates within the Roman Catholic Archdiocese of Detroit.

Description
The high school building is part of the Most Holy Redeemer Church parish. It is co-sponsored by the Sisters, Servants of the Immaculate Heart of Mary and The Congregation of St. Basil. The school is located in the former Holy Redeemer High School building. It is the only coeducational Catholic high school in the city of Detroit, and is open to students of all faiths.

Detroit Cristo Rey High School opened August 2008 with an initial freshman class of about 100 and graduated its first class in 2012.  It is part of the Cristo Rey Network of high schools nationwide, the original being Cristo Rey Jesuit High School in Chicago. The founding president of Detroit Cristo Rey was Earl J. Robinson, a past president of Lees-McRae College. The Board of Trustees named Michael Khoury president in 2009. Its founding principal was Susan Rowe, a former teacher and administrator at University of Detroit Jesuit High School.

Admissions, tuition, demographics
A student admitted in the ninth grade must be able to read at a seventh grade level; students unable to meet this requirement may not be admitted.

Cristo Rey schools are designed for children from low-income families. Each school has a maximum income cap for applicants. Detroit Cristo Rey has a standard tuition of $2,300/year but many families work at the school to lower their tuition costs to around $1,000/year.

During its first year (2008-2009), Detroit Cristo Rey had a student body that was approximately 50 percent African-American and 40 percent Hispanic. Approximately 50 percent of the student body was Catholic.

Local Support
In 2009, Detroit Cristo Rey High School received grants from The Skillman Foundation ($900,000), the McGregor Fund ($75,000), and the Community Foundation for Southeast Michigan.

Students collaborated with Detroit Institute of Arts Art studio instructor Vito Valdez to create a mural representing the school and community.

Corporate Work Study Program
Cristo Rey Network schools utilize a unique work study program that pairs students and local businesses. Students work one day a week at a local business while their wages are paid to the school for their tuition. In the 2009-2010 school year, "About 35 employers and 120 freshmen and sophomores are involved, and the program covered about 35 to 40 percent of the school's total expenses."

Activities 
All students participate in an off-site retreat each year, which for seniors runs overnight. Students contribute over 40 hours of community service during their four years.

The Cristo Rey Model
In January 2008, Loyola Press released a book titled More than A Dream: How One School's Vision is Changing the World (More than a Dream official site).  The book, authored by G.R. Kearney, a writer and former volunteer teacher at Cristo Rey Jesuit High School in Chicago, documents the unlikely development of the Cristo Rey model and its remarkable success throughout the United States.

In August 2014, HarperOne released a book titled Putting Education to Work: How Cristo Rey High Schools are Transforming Urban Education. Written by journalist Megan Sweas, the book examines the success of the Cristo Rey Network and its impact on American education reform.

References

External links
 School Website
Cristo Rey Network
 Partners - Cristo Rey Network 
 60 minutes
 Aljazeera, America Tonight
 Fr. John P. Foley honored with Presidential Citizen's Medal
Cristo Rey Featured in WashPost column by George Will
 Boston Globe - With sense of purpose, students cut class for a day 
 Bill & Melinda Gates Foundation - Success of Innovative Urban Catholic School Sparks Major Investment

Roman Catholic Archdiocese of Detroit
Catholic secondary schools in Michigan
Educational institutions established in 2008
Cristo Rey Network
High schools in Detroit
2008 establishments in Michigan
Poverty-related organizations